Incilius macrocristatus (formerly Bufo macrocristatus; common name large-crested toad or huge-crested toad) a species of toad in the family Bufonidae. It is found in Chiapas in southern Mexico and the adjacent Guatemala. Its natural habitats are cloud forests and pine-oak-Liquidambar forests. Breeding takes place in streams. It is a rare species that is threatened by habitat loss caused by agriculture and human settlement, and by water pollution.

References

macrocristatus
Amphibians of Guatemala
Amphibians of Mexico
Amphibians described in 1957
Taxonomy articles created by Polbot